Luca Amato (born 24 August 1996, in Cologne) is a German motorcycle racer.

Career statistics

CEV Buckler Moto3 Championship

Races by year
(key) (Races in bold indicate pole position, races in italics indicate fastest lap)

Grand Prix motorcycle racing

By season

By class

Races by year

External links

1996 births
Living people
German motorcycle racers
Moto3 World Championship riders
Sportspeople from Cologne